Eric Molloy (born 12 December 1992) is an Irish footballer.

Career
Molloy was born in Carlow, Ireland. He started his senior career with Arklow Town. After that, he played for Wexford, Southern United, and Team Wellington. In 2019, he signed for Stomil Olsztyn in the Polish I liga. Molloy returned to home and signed for League of Ireland Premier Division club Waterford on 25 March 2021. He made his debut a day later in a 2–1 loss to Sligo Rovers. Molloy signed for League of Ireland First Division club Shelbourne on 22 July 2021. Having been released by Shels at the end of the 2021 season, Molloy joined Longford Town for the 2022 campaign.

Career statistics

Honours
Wexford
League of Ireland First Division: 2015

Team Wellington
Charity Cup: 2017
OFC Champions League: 2018

Shelbourne
League of Ireland First Division: 2021

References

External links
 Molloy thriving in Poland
 Molloy: Olsztyn jest bardzo przyjemnym miejscem do życia 
 Southern United's Irish import Eric Molloy enjoying the attacking nature of NZ league 
 'I was working at a chocolate factory in Carlow. Two years later I’m at the Fifa Club World Cup alongside Real Madrid'
 Carlow's Molloy on a high after booking ticket to World stage 
 Southern United's backflipping Irish import Eric Molloy keeping feet on the ground

Living people
1992 births
Republic of Ireland association footballers
Association football wingers
League of Ireland players
Arklow Town F.C. players
Wexford F.C. players
Southern United FC players
Team Wellington players
OKS Stomil Olsztyn players
Waterford F.C. players
Shelbourne F.C. players
Longford Town F.C. players
Republic of Ireland expatriate association footballers
Irish expatriate sportspeople in New Zealand
Expatriate association footballers in New Zealand
Irish expatriate sportspeople in Poland
Expatriate footballers in Poland